There are two species of skink named Northern dwarf skink:

 Menetia maini, found in Northern Territory, Queensland, and Western Australia
 Nannoscincus exos, found in New Caledonia